Whose War Is It? is a non-fiction book by Jack Granatstein (published J.L. Granatstein), a Canadian historian and military veteran. It critiques several aspects of Canadian politics, foreign policy and national defense, including Canadian involvement in United Nations peacekeeping missions, Canadian national interests, Canada – United States relations, the state of the Canadian Arctic, Quebec pacifism and Canada's policy of multiculturalism.

Reception 
The book received mainly positive reviews throughout major Canadian newspapers. The Montreal Gazette described the book as "essential reading for anybody interested in Canada's defence and foreign policy." The Calgary Herald described the book as "a short, sharp, reality slap to Canadians who think terrorists would never attack us given half an opportunity." The Globe and Mail asked the question: "Does Canada need a foreign policy? You bet it does, and [Whose War Is It?] tells us why."

The book, however, has been criticized for its oversimplification of issues by Kim Krenz, a journalist at the Canadian Military Journal.

See also
 Canadian military
 Canadian politics
 Canadian foreign policy

References

External links
 Official website (at HarperCollins Canada)

2007 non-fiction books
Canadian non-fiction books
HarperCollins books